Bruno Locher is a Swiss retired footballer who played in the 1950s as striker.

Locher first played for SC Kleinhüningen and joined FC Basel's first team for their 1956–57 season under manager Béla Sárosi. After playing in four test matches, Locher played his domestic league debut for his new club in the home game at the Landhof on 28 October 1956 as Basel won 3–0 against Chiasso.

Locher played only one season for Basel and during this time he played a total of 11 games scoring one goal. Five of these games were in the Nationalliga A, one in the Swiss Cup and five were friendly games. He scored his goal on the test game against Biel-Bienne on 29 July 1956.

References

Sources
 Die ersten 125 Jahre. Publisher: Josef Zindel im Friedrich Reinhardt Verlag, Basel. 
 Verein "Basler Fussballarchiv" Homepage
(NB: Despite all efforts, the editors of these books and the authors in "Basler Fussballarchiv" have failed to be able to identify all the players, their date and place of birth or date and place of death, who played in the games during the early years of FC Basel)

FC Basel players
Swiss men's footballers
Association football forwards